The Men's time trial of the 2016 UCI Road World Championships was a cycling event that took place on 12 October 2016 in Doha, Qatar. It was the 23rd edition of the championship; Vasil Kiryienka of Belarus was the defending champion, after winning his first title in 2015.

Kiryienka was unable to defend his title as he was beaten by Germany's Tony Martin, who won a record-equalling fourth world title in the discipline. Martin finished 45.05 seconds clear of Kiryienka, with the bronze medal being won by the European champion Jonathan Castroviejo from Spain, who was 25.86 seconds behind Kiryienka and 1 minute, 10.91 seconds in arrears of Martin.

Course

Qualification
All National Federations were allowed to enter two riders to start the time trial.

Final classification

References

Men's time trial
UCI Road World Championships – Men's time trial
2016 in men's road cycling